St. Michael's is a Jesuit church in Munich, southern Germany, the largest Renaissance church north of the Alps. The style of the building had an enormous influence on Southern German early Baroque architecture.

History 
In 1556, Albert V, Duke of Bavaria granted the Society of Jesus (Jesuits) permission to establish what is now Wilhelmsgymnasium in Munich, thus establishing the order's presence in the city. The collegiate church was only established during the reign of his son William V, Duke of Bavaria, also known as "the Pious". who was a supporter of the Jesuits' Counter Reformation tenets.

The church was finally consecrated in 1597, after fourteen years of construction. When the Jesuits were suppressed and banned from most Catholic territories in Europe, the church came into possession of the Bavarian Royal Family and eventually the State of Bavaria, when Germany became a republic.

Architecture 

The church was built by William V, Duke of Bavaria between 1583–97 as a spiritual center for the Counter Reformation. The foundation stone was laid in 1585.

In order to realise his ambitious plans for the church and the adjoining college, Duke William had 87 houses in the best location pulled down, ignoring the protests of the citizens. The church was erected in two stages. In the first stage (1583–88), the church was built by the model of Il Gesù in Rome and given a barrel-vaulted roof by an unknown architect, the vault being the largest in the world apart from that of St Peter's Basilica in Rome, spanning freely more than 20 meters.

When the church was built, there were doubts about the stability of the vaulting. But it was the tower that collapsed in 1590, destroying the just completed quire. Duke William V took it as a bad omen and so planned to build a much larger church. The second phase of construction continued until the consecration of the church in 1597. Friedrich Sustris built on to the undamaged nave a new quire and a transept and a magnificent facade. The church is 78.2 meters long, 20.3 meters wide and 28.2 meters high.

The facade is impressive and contains standing statues of Duke Wilhelm and earlier rulers of the Bavarian Wittelsbach dynasty, cast in bronze, in the form of a family tree.
Hubert Gerhard's large bronze statue between the two entrances shows the Archangel Michael fighting for the Faith and killing the Evil in the shape of a humanoid demon.

The interior is a representation of the triumph of Roman Catholicism in Bavaria during the Counter-Reformation. The heavily indented chancel arch as well as the short side aisles and even the side chapels are designed as a triumphal arch to ancient model. A very deep choir room adjoins the mighty nave. The stucco decoration of the nave represents the life of Jesus Christ. The altarpiece "Annunciation" was created by Peter Candid (1587). The sculpture of the holy angel in the nave from Hubert Gerhard (1595) was originally intended for the tomb of William V, which was not completed.

Having suffered severe damage during the Second World War, the church was restored in 1946–48. Finally, between 1980 and 1983, the stucco-work was restored. The spire which lost its steepletop in World War II is situated further north next to the former convent.

Burial places 

The church crypt contains the tomb of Eugène de Beauharnais. A monument was erected by Bertel Thorwaldsen in 1830 in the church. Eugène was the son of Josephine de Beauharnais, Napoleon's wife and her first husband, general Alexandre de Beauharnais. He married a daughter of King Maximilian I Joseph of Bavaria in 1806 and was created Duke of Leuchtenberg in 1817. In the right transept, there is a cross monument of Giovanni da Bologna.

The crypt contains among others the tombs of these members of the Wittelsbach dynasty:
 William V, Duke of Bavaria, (reg. 1579–1597)
 Maximilian I, Elector of Bavaria, (reg. 1597–1651)
 Charles II August, Duke of Zweibrücken
 King Ludwig II of Bavaria, (reg. 1864–1886)
 King Otto of Bavaria, (reg. 1886–1913), Ludwig's younger brother
 Prince Leopold of Bavaria, titular King of Greece.
 Archduchess Gisela of Austria, eldest surviving child of Emperor Franz Joseph I of Austria and Empress Elisabeth

See also 
 Saint Michael: Roman Catholic traditions and views
 List of Jesuit sites

References

Sources

External links 

 Photo spread of St Michael's Church/Michaelskirche
 360° Panorama View

Roman Catholic churches completed in 1597
16th-century Roman Catholic church buildings in Germany
Michael's Church
Renaissance architecture in Munich
Jesuit churches in Germany
Tourist attractions in Munich
Burial sites of the House of Beauharnais
Burial sites of the House of Wittelsbach
Cultural heritage monuments in Munich